Allan Maxam (born October 28, 1942) is one of the pioneers of molecular genetics. He was one of the contributors to develop a DNA sequencing method at Harvard University, while working as a student in the laboratory of Walter Gilbert.

Walter Gilbert and Allan Maxam developed a DNA sequencing method - now called Maxam-Gilbert sequencing - which combined chemicals that cut DNA only at specific bases with radioactive labeling and polyacrylamide gel electrophoresis to determine the sequence of long DNA segments.

Allan Maxam and Walter Gilbert’s 1977 paper “A new method for sequencing DNA” was honored by a Citation for Chemical Breakthrough Award from the Division of History of Chemistry of the American Chemical Society for 2017.  It was presented to the Department of Molecular & Cellular Biology, Harvard University.

References

 Gilbert, Walter and Maxam. Allan, The Nucleotide Sequence of the Lac Operator, Proc. Natl. Acad. Sci. USA 70, 3581-3584 (1973).
 Maxam AM, Tizard R, Skryabin KG, Gilbert W, Promoter region for yeast 5S ribosomal RNA, Nature. 1977 June 16;267(5612):643-5

See also
 Walter Gilbert
 Fred Sanger

1942 births
Living people
Harvard University alumni
American geneticists